The 1938 Sewanee Tigers football team was an American football team that represented Sewanee: The University of the South as a member of the Southeastern Conference during the 1938 college football season. In their eighth season under head coach Harry E. Clark, Sewanee compiled a 1–8 record.

Schedule

References

Sewanee
Sewanee Tigers football seasons
Sewanee Tigers football